Korir may refer to:

Korir (surname)
Korir, Iran, a village in Mazandaran Province

See also
Kipkorir, related surname meaning a boy born towards morning
Jepkorir, related surname meaning a girl born around 0630hrs